Algirdas (Alhierd, Olherd, Olgerd, ;  – May 1377) was the Grand Duke of Lithuania from 1345 to 1377. With the help of his brother Kęstutis (who defended the western border of the Duchy) he created an empire stretching from the present Baltic states to the Black Sea and to within  of Moscow.

Background
Algirdas was one of the seven sons of Grand Duke Gediminas. Before his death in 1341, Gediminas divided his domain, leaving his youngest son Jaunutis in possession of the capital, Vilnius. With the aid of his brother, Kęstutis, Algirdas drove out the incompetent Jaunutis and declared himself Grand Duke in 1345. He devoted the next thirty-two years to the development and expansion of the Grand Duchy of Lithuania.

After becoming the ruler of Lithuania, Algirdas was titled the King of Lithuania in the Livonian Chronicles instead of the Ruthenian terms knyaz or velikiy knyaz (grand prince).

Two factors are thought to have contributed to this result: the political sagacity of Algirdas and the devotion of Kęstutis. The division of their dominions is illustrated by the fact that Algirdas appears almost exclusively in East Slavic sources, while Western chronicles primarily describe Kęstutis. Lithuania was surrounded by enemies. The Teutonic Order in the northwest and the Golden Horde in the southeast sought Lithuanian territory, while Poland to the west and Moscow principality to the east were generally hostile competitors.

Expansion of Lithuania

Algirdas held his own, also acquiring influence and territory at the expense of Moscow principality and the Golden Horde and extending the borders of the Grand Duchy of Lithuania to the Black Sea. His principal efforts were directed toward securing the Slavic lands which were part of former Rus'. Although Algirdas engineered the election of his son Andrew as Prince of Pskov and a powerful minority of Novgorod Republic citizens supported him against Moscow principality, his rule in both commercial centres was (at best) precarious.

Algirdas occupied the important principalities of Smolensk and Bryansk in western Moscow principality. Although his relationship with the grand dukes of Moscow principality was generally friendly (demonstrated by his marriages to two Orthodox Russian princesses), he besieged Moscow in 1368 and 1370 during the Lithuanian–Muscovite War (1368–1372). An important feat by Algirdas was his victory over the Tatars in the Battle of Blue Waters at the Southern Bug in 1362, which resulted in the breakup of the Kipchaks and compelled the khan to establish his headquarters in the Crimea.

Religion and death

According to modern historians, "For Gediminas and Algirdas, retention of paganism provided a useful diplomatic tool and weapon ... that allowed them to use promises of conversion as a means of preserving their power and independence". Hermann von Wartberge and Jan Długosz described Algirdas as a pagan until his death in 1377. Contemporary Byzantine accounts support the Western sources; Patriarch Neilos described Algirdas as "fire-worshipping prince" and another patriarch, Philotheos, excommunicated all Ruthenian noblemen who helped the "impious" Algirdas. His pagan beliefs were also mentioned in 14th-century Byzantine historian Nicephorus Gregoras' accounts.

His alleged burial site has undergone archaeological research since 2009. Algirdas' descendants include the Trubetzkoy, Czartoryski and Sanguszko families.

Although Algirdas was said to have ordered the death of Anthony, John, and Eustathius of Vilnius, who were later glorified as martyrs of the Russian Orthodox Church, the 16th-century Bychowiec Chronicle and 17th-century Hustynska Chronicle maintain that he converted to Orthodox Christianity some time before his marriage to Maria of Vitebsk in 1318. Several Orthodox churches were built in Vilnius during his reign, but later assertions about his baptism are uncorroborated by contemporary sources. Despite contemporary accounts and modern studies, however, some Russian historians (such as Batiushikov) claim that Algirdas was an Orthodox ruler. The Kiev Monastery of the Caves' commemorative book, underwritten by Algirdas' descendants, recorded his baptismal name as Demetrius during the 1460s. Following Wojciech Wijuk Kojałowicz and Macarius I, Volodymyr Antonovych writes that Algirdas took monastic vows several days before his death and was interred at the Cathedral of the Theotokos in Vilnius under the monastic name Alexius.

Issue
With Maria of Vitebsk:
 Andrei of Polotsk (1325 – 12 August 1399), Duke of Polock (1342–1387), Pskov (1342–1348)
 Demetrius I Starszy (1327 – 12 August 1399 in the Battle of the Vorskla River), Duke of Bryansk (1356–1379 and 1388–1399)
 Constantine (died before 30 October 1390), Prince of Czartorysk. According to J. Tęgowski, he may be son of Koriat.
 Vladimir Olgerdovich (died after October 1398), Prince of Kiev (1362–1394), Kopyl, Sluck. Ancestor of Olelkovich and Belsky families.
 Fiodor (Theodore; died in 1399), Prince of Rylsk (1370–1399), Ratnie (1387–1394), Bryansk (1393)
Fiedora, wife of Sviatoslav of Karachev
Agrypina (baptized Mary; died in 1393), wife of Boris of Suzdal

With Uliana of Tver:
 Jogaila (c. 1351 – 1 June 1434), Grand Duke of Lithuania (1377–1381, 1382–1392), King of Poland (1386–1434)
 Skirgaila (baptized Ivan; c. 1354 – 11 January 1397 in Kiev), Duke of Trakai (1382–1395), Kiev (1395–1397), regent of Lithuania
 Kaributas (baptized Dmitry) (after 1350 – after 1404), Prince of Novhorod-Siverskyi (1386–1392/93)
 Lengvenis (baptised Simon; died after 19 June 1431), Prince of Mstislavl, regent of Novgorod Republic
 Karigaila (baptized Cassimir; after 1350–1390), Prince of Mstislavl
 Vygantas (baptized Alexander; after 1350 – 28 June 1392), Prince of Kernavė
 Švitrigaila (baptized Boleslaw; c. 1370 – 10 February 1452 in Lutsk), Grand Duke of Lithuania (1430–1432), ruler of Volynia (1437–1452)
Kenna (baptized Joan; c. 1350 – 27 April 1368), wife of Casimir IV, Duke of Pomerania
Helen (after 1350 – 15 September 1438), wife of Vladimir the Bold
Maria (born after 1350), wife of Vaidila and David of Gorodets
Wilheida (baptized Catherine; after 1350 – after 4 April 1422), wife of John II, Duke of Mecklenburg-Stargard
Alexandra of Masovia (after 1350 – 19 June 1434), wife of Siemowit IV, Duke of Masovia
Jadwiga (after 1350 – after 1407), wife of Jan III of Oświęcim

Through his son Vladimir, Algirdas is the fifth great-grandfather of Elizabeth Báthory.

Assessment

Algirdas balanced himself between Moscow principality and Poland, spoke Lithuanian and Ruthenian (among other languages) and followed the majority of his pagan and Orthodox subjects rather than to alienate them by promoting Roman Catholicism. His son Jogaila ascended the Polish throne, converted to Roman Catholicism and founded the dynasty which ruled Lithuania and Poland for nearly 200 years.

Algirdas (Alhierd) is also widely honoured in Belarus as a unifier of all Belarusian lands within one state, a successful military commander and ruler of medieval Belarus. A monument to him has been erected in Vitsebsk in 2014, as part of the celebration of the city's 1040th anniversary. Algirdas was Duke of Vitebsk for over 20 years before becoming Grand Duke of Lithuania.

In December 2022, the National Bank of the Republic of Belarus issued a commemorative coin dedicated to the Battle of Blue Waters with a portrait of Algirdas.

Popular culture
Algirdas features in the 2021 video game Age of Empires II: Definitive Edition - Dawn of the Dukes in a campaign detailing the exploits of himself and his brother Kęstutis.

See also

Gediminids

References

1296 births
1377 deaths
Gediminids
Grand Dukes of Lithuania

Converts to Eastern Orthodoxy from paganism
Lithuanian former pagans
Eastern Orthodox Christians from Lithuania
Eastern Orthodox monarchs
Date of birth unknown
Lithuanian monarchy